The Lyman Reservoir is the largest lake in the region. Lyman Lake State Park, is located in and administered by the Apache-Sitgreaves National Forest, attracts anglers, as well as campers and water skiers year-round.

History 
Lyman Lake State Park was officially dedicated on July 1, 1961, making it Arizona's first recreational State Park. The run-offs from nearby Mount Baldy and Escudilla Mountain, the second and third tallest mountains in Arizona respectively, feed into Lyman Lake Reservoir.

Location

Description

The lake lies entirely within Lyman Lake State Park. The weather is ideal in the spring, summer, and fall months with average temperatures ranging from eighty to ninety degrees. A few of many leisurely activities in the park include hiking, boating, swimming, fishing. Lyman Reservoir is a warm water reservoir containing largemouth bass, channel catfish, crappie, carp and a few walleye.

Amenities

The State Parks and Recreation Department maintains year-round visitor amenities. Due to the vast size of Lyman Lake, there are no restrictions on boat sizes. A wide variety of watercraft are also authorized in the park such as canoes, kayaks, and jet skis. The park consists of 56 campsites.

References

External links
 Arizona Boating Locations Facilities Map
 Arizona Fishing Locations Map

Reservoirs in Apache County, Arizona
Reservoirs in Arizona